Kilcumreragh is a civil parish which spans the counties of Westmeath and Offaly in Ireland.

Kilcumreragh also spans three baronies. It is one of 8 civil parishes in the barony of Moycashel (M), 4 civil parishes in the barony of Clonlonan (C) and 4 civil parishes in the Offaly barony of Kilcoursey (K), all in the Province of Leinster.

Kilcumreragh civil parish comprises the village of Rosemount and 32 townlands: Ballagh (C), Ballinderry (C and M), Ballinlig (M), Ballintober (M), Ballybeg (C), Ballybrickoge (M), Ballybroder (C), Ballynagall (M), Ballynagrenia (M), Ballynahinch (K), Brackagh (K), Burrow or Glennanummer (K), Cartron Glebe (K), Coolatoor or Grouselodge (M), Coolatoor (M), Curragh (M), Curraghanana (K), Custorum (M), Derryhall (M), Curraghanana (K), Earlscartron (K), Faheeran (K), Fearboy (K), Feargarrow (K), Grange (M), Grouselodge or Coolatoor (M), Kilcatherina (C), Kilcumeragh (M), Kilmurragh (K), Laragh (M), Lisnagree (M) Newtown and Parkwood (K).

The neighbouring civil parishes are: Killare (barony of Rathconrath) to the north, Ardnurcher or Horseleap to the east, Kilmanaghan (Barony of Clonlonan), Kilcumreragh  (County Offaly) and Kilmanaghan (County Offaly) to the south, Ballyloughloe (Clonlonan) to the west and Ballymore  (Rathconrath) to the west and north.

References

External links
Kilcumreragh civil parish at the IreAtlas Townland Data Base
Kilcumreragh civil parish, County Westmeath at townlands.ie
Kilcumreragh civil parish, County Offaly at townlands.ie
Kilcumreragh civil parish, County Westmeath at The Placenames Database of Ireland
Kilcumreragh civil parish, County Offaly at The Placenames Database of Ireland

Civil parishes of County Westmeath
Civil parishes of County Offaly